Sören Wikström (born 29 September 1960) is a Swedish biathlete. He competed in the 20 km individual event at the 1980 Winter Olympics.

References

1960 births
Living people
Swedish male biathletes
Olympic biathletes of Sweden
Biathletes at the 1980 Winter Olympics
People from Malung-Sälen Municipality
20th-century Swedish people